The 1993–94 Umaglesi Liga was the fifth season of top-tier football in Georgia. It began on 8 August 1993 and ended on 18 June 1994. Dinamo Tbilisi were the defending champions.

Locations

Preliminary stage

Eastern Group

Results

Western Group

Results

Final stage

Championship group

Results

Relegation group

Results

Top goalscorers

See also
1993–94 Pirveli Liga
1993–94 Georgian Cup

References
Georgia - List of final tables (RSSSF)

Erovnuli Liga seasons
1
Georgia